Hyposidra aquilaria is a geometer moth in the Ennominae subfamily. It is found in Northwestern Himalaya, Western, Southern and Eastern China, Peninsular Malaysia, Sumatra, and Borneo. It is a rare species of lowland forests.

External links
The Moths of Borneo

Boarmiini
Ennominae
Moths of Borneo
Moths of Malaysia
Moths of Asia
Moths described in 1862